Charles William Isenhart (born March 30, 1959, in Dubuque, Iowa)  is a Democratic politician, representing the 27th District in the Iowa House of Representatives since 2008.

Education
Isenhart graduated from Wahlert High School and in 1981 obtained his degree in political science and mass communications from Loras College. In 1984 he received his master's degree in journalism from Marquette University.

Career
Outside politics Isenhart owns a small business called Common Good Services. From 1990 to 2007, he was executive director of the Dubuque Area Labor-Management Council.

Organizations
Isenhart has been or is currently a member of the following organizations:

Professional
Labor and Employment Relations Association
National Business Coalition on Health
Iowa 2010 Strategic Planning Council
Iowans for a Better Future Board of Directors
Governor's 21st Century Workforce Council 
Federal Mediation and Conciliation Service Customer Council

Community
Dubuque Housing Commission
Dubuque Community Development Commission
Dubuque County Mental Health/Developmental Disabilities Stakeholders Committee
Dubuque Soccer Club
American Youth Soccer Organization 
America's River Soccer Classic 
Dubuque Housing Coalition
Healthy Dubuque 2000
Crescent Community Health Center Planning Committee
Downtown Neighborhood Council
St. Raphael Cathedral Parish
Habitat for Humanity board
Project Concern
Dubuque Food Pantry 
Dubuque Soccer Alliance

References

External links
 Representative Charles Isenhart official Iowa General Assembly site
Charles Isenhart State Representative official constituency site
 

Democratic Party members of the Iowa House of Representatives
Living people
Place of birth missing (living people)
1959 births
21st-century American politicians
Politicians from Dubuque, Iowa